Wong Jan-lung (born 27 March 1950), better known by his pseudonym Wong Yuk-long or Tony Wong, is a Hong Kong manhua artist, publisher and actor, who wrote and created Little Rascals (later re-titled Oriental Heroes) and Weapons of the Gods. He also wrote adaptations of Louis Cha's novels, such as The Return of the Condor Heroes (retitled as Legendary Couples), Demi-Gods and Semi-Devils, and Ode to Gallantry. For his contribution and influencing a generation of artists in the local industry, he is regarded as the "Godfather of Hong Kong comics" or "Hong Kong's King of Comics".

He provided the art for Batman: Hong Kong, which was written by Doug Moench. He has also acted in some films occasionally, including making a cameo appearance in Dragon Tiger Gate (a film adapted from Oriental Heroes).

Selected works
 Buddha's Palm (如來神掌), based on Gu Long's Juedai Shuangjiao
 Demi-Gods and Semi-Devils (天龍八部), based on Louis Cha's novel of the same title.
 Dino Crisis (恐龍危機), based on the Capcom game of the same name. 
 Drunken Master (醉拳; "Drunken Fist")
 Jackie Chan's Fantasia (奇幻龙宝) this fantasy comic book mixing by roman soldier Hindu soldier, pharaoh's soldier, and a Song dynasty soldier.
 Legendary Couples (神鵰俠侶; "Companion of the Condor Hero"), based on Louis Cha's novel The Return of the Condor Heroes.
 Legend of Emperors (天子傳奇; "Emperor Legend"), featuring fictionalised stories of various Chinese kings and emperors.
 Mega Dragon and Tiger (龍虎５世; "Dragon and Tiger V")
 Oriental Heroes (龍虎門 Long Hu Men; "Dragon-Tiger-Gate"), originally titled Little Rascals (小流氓).
 Weapons of the Gods (神兵玄奇; "Mysterious Weapons of the Gods").

References

External links
 Wong Yuk-long at Lambiek's Comiclopedia
 Batman: Hong Kong review
 Giant Robot Interview
 Biographical information and discussion of his impact on video games

1950 births
Living people
Hong Kong comics artists
Hong Kong comics writers